Terry Sullivan (born 6 November 1935) is a former Welsh indoor and outdoor bowler. He was a member of the Swansea bowls club. Sullivan became a Welsh international in 1980 and was Welsh National Indoor Champion in 1983. After winning the CIS UK Indoor singles at Preston in 1984 he achieved his greatest moment when winning the 1985 World Indoor Bowls Championship crown.

Outdoors he won the 1990 pairs title at the Welsh National Bowls Championships with Stephen Rees.

References

Living people
Welsh male bowls players
1935 births
Indoor Bowls World Champions